Indian Telly Award for Best Television Personality of the Year is an award given by Indiantelevision.com  as part of its annual Indian Telly Awards for TV serials, to recognize a television anchor/host/actor/presenter/professional who overshadowed all his peers either on the screen or off it leaving an indelible mark/stamp during the year and have consistently topped in terms of impact, visibility, acceptability. He/she could have remarkably improved the viewership of a channel or programme by his/her unique presence.

The award was first awarded in 2001 to Bollywood actor Amitabh Bachchan for hosting popular reality show Kaun Banega Crorepati. Most of the times, the winner is announced out of nominations but sometimes the award is given without nominations. In 2007, 2009 and 2010, the award was awarded with different titles. Only once, in 2012, the award was given separately to a male and female personality.

List of winners

2001-2009
2001 Amitabh Bachchan   
2002 Cezanne Khan 
 Prannoy Roy
 Harsha Bhogle
 Vir Sanghvi
 Rajdeep Sardesai
 Amitabh Bachchan 
 Navjot Singh Sidhu
 Shekhar Suman
2003 Smriti Irani 
2004 Rajeev Khandelwal 
Hiten Tejwani
Niki Aneja Walia
Mandira Bedi
Mona Singh
2005 Rajeev Khandelwal 
 Ronit Roy
 Abhijeet Sawant
 Shekhar Suman
2006 Ronit Roy 
 Javed Jaffrey
 Rajdeep Sardesai
 Navjot Singh Sidhu
2007 Hussain Kuwajerwala  (Style Icon of the Year)	  	  	 			
Ronit Roy 			
Rajeev Khandelwal 							
Rajdeep Sardesai
2008 Akshay Kumar 				
Salman Khan								
Shilpa Shetty				
Saroj Khan				
Parul Chauhan				
Sara Khan				
Shahrukh Khan				
Shaan
2009 Rani Mukerji  (TV Ki Rani Award)

2010-present
2010 Ronit Roy (10th Anniversary Special Award for TV Star of the Decade)
2011 No Award
2012 Ronit Roy (Male) and Ankita Lokhande  (Female) 
Barun Sobti 
Pratyusha Banerjee
Gia Manek
2013 Karan Singh Grover 
2014 Rohit Shetty
2015 Divyanka Tripathi
2016 Not Awarded
2017 Not Awarded
2018 Not Awarded
2019 Divyanka Tripathi

References
Indian Telly Awards 2007pulkit samrat awards performance

Indian Telly Awards